Sara Al Senaani is a Paralympic athlete from United Arab Emirates. She is the first female Paralympic athlete to win a medal at the Summer Paralympics for the United Arab Emirates. She represented the country at the 2016 Summer Paralympics in Rio de Janeiro, Brazil and she won the bronze medal in the women's shot put F33 event.

At the 2019 World Para Athletics Championships held in Dubai, United Arab Emirates, she finished in 9th place in the women's shot put F33 event. She set a new personal best of 5.33m.

Achievements

Notes

References 

Living people
Year of birth missing (living people)
Place of birth missing (living people)
Paralympic athletes of the United Arab Emirates
Athletes (track and field) at the 2016 Summer Paralympics
Medalists at the 2016 Summer Paralympics
Paralympic bronze medalists for the United Arab Emirates
Emirati female shot putters
Paralympic medalists in athletics (track and field)